Jalalabad-e Marbin (also Romanized as Jalālābād-e Mārbīn; also known as Jalālābād) is a village in Zazeran Rural District, in the Central District of Falavarjan County, Isfahan Province, Iran. At the 2006 census, its population was 1,775, in 462 families.

References 

Populated places in Falavarjan County